Stabilin-2 is a protein that in humans is encoded by the STAB2 gene.

Function 

This gene encodes a large, transmembrane receptor protein which may function in angiogenesis, lymphocyte homing, cell adhesion, or receptor scavenging. The protein contains 7 fasciclin, 15 epidermal growth factor (EGF)-like, and 2 laminin-type EGF-like domains as well as a C-type lectin-like hyaluronan-binding Link module. The protein is primarily expressed on liver sinusoidal endothelial cells, spleen, and lymph node. The receptor has been shown to bind and endocytose ligands such as hyaluronan, low density lipoprotein, Gram-positive and Gram-negative bacteria, and advanced glycosylation end products. Supporting its possible role as a scavenger receptor, the protein has been shown to cycle between the plasma membrane and lysosomes.

References

Further reading